The Hamburg Animation Award is an annual international competition for emerging creative talent in animated design. It was initiated in 2003 by the Hamburg Chamber of Commerce and the animation-school-hamburg.

Competition 
The Hamburg Animation Award is a platform for showcasing new talent in the field of animation and a networking opportunity for new artists and producers.
It addresses students, alumni and young professionals from art and technical schools, academies and universities all over the world.

The best animated short films using any technique (2D, 3D, stop-motion, puppet animation etc.) will be nominated by the expert jury. Submission criteria are a length up to 10 minutes and the creator being a newcomer. The entry can be a graduate project or a short film finished up to three years after graduation. The projects are selected in terms of the components "style" and "story". The competition is looking for an inventive and coherent story told in a fresh or intriguing way, with a style that stands out from existing styles.

Apart from the three main prizes, there are the Harald Siepermann Character Design Award and the Audience Award. A "country award" existed up to 2012 among the entries of all young graduates and animation designers from an annual changing partner country. All submitted shorts for the country award were automatically admitted to the main competition as well. Until 2012 the partner countries included China, France, Denmark, Turkey, United Arab Emirates, New Zealand and the Czech Republic.

Awards and ceremony 
Trophies with a total value of 11,000 euros are awarded annually.

 Hamburg Animation Award - 1st Prize: 4.000 Euro
 Hamburg Animation Award - 2nd Prize: 3.000 Euro
 Hamburg Animation Award - 3rd Prize: 2.000 Euro
 Harald Siepermann Character Design Award: 1.000 Euro
 Audience Award: 1.000 Euro

The prizes are awarded at a festive gala ceremony in Hamburg every June. In 2016, the Animation Award will take place at the Börsensaal of the Hamburg Chamber of Commerce. The locations of previous award ceremonies have included the CinemaxX Dammtor, Streits Filmtheater, the Abaton Cinema and Schmidts Tivoli.

The award ceremony is rounded off by talks, panels and networking events. Until 2014, the Made in Hamburg - Animation Jam took place on the day following the award, a fair and lecture event for professional animators and the animation, advertising, film, games and visual effects industry.

Award winners

See also

 List of animation awards

External links 
 Homepage of the Hamburg Animation Award
 Article about the winning film in 2005 Bo

German film awards
Animation awards
Culture in Hamburg